Some Nice Things I’ve Missed is a 1974 album by the American singer Frank Sinatra. Consisting mainly of songs made popular by other artists, the album's title reflects that Sinatra was catching up on songs that came out while he was in retirement from 1971 to 1973.

In popular culture 
In the December 1974 Kojak episode, Cross Your Heart and Hope to Die, Frank Sinatra is mentioned several times by Greg (George Shannon), the soon-to-be-murdered victim, while in his apartment attempting to seduce his date. He then puts on a Sinatra record but the music is not heard. In an attempt to solve the crime, Kojak (Telly Savalas) mentions Sinatra several more times during the episode. Halfway through the program, he enters the police department holding a copy of Some Nice Things I've Missed and throws the record on a desk as he begins a conversation with others officers. Meanwhile, Sgt. Stavros (Telly's real-life brother George Savalas) sits on the desk without paying attention to what's underneath. Before leaving the office, Kojak turns to Stavros as says "Fatso, you're sittin' on Old Blue Eyes". Unnerved, Stavros picks up the vinyl and hands it over to Kojak before walking out. In the next scene, Kojak arrives at the apartment of Lisa Walden (Andrea Marcovicci), still holding the album, and tells her "I brought you a Frank Sinatra album". Coincidentally, Telly Savalas also recorded a cover of the song "If" (as Sinatra did on this album), which was released as a single only three months later.

Track listing

Charts

Certifications

Personnel
 Frank Sinatra – Vocals
 Don Costa – Arranger, Conductor (Tracks 1-2, 4-6, 8-10)
 Gordon Jenkins – Arranger, Conductor (Tracks 3 & 7)

References

1974 albums
Frank Sinatra albums
Albums arranged by Don Costa
Albums arranged by Gordon Jenkins
Albums produced by Jimmy Bowen
Albums produced by Don Costa
Albums produced by Sonny Burke
Reprise Records albums